Benton Community Schools may refer to:
 Benton Community School Corporation (Indiana)
 Benton Community School District (Iowa)